{{ethnic group|
|group=Matis
|image=
|population=390 (2010)
|popplace=
|rels=traditional tribal religion
|langs=Matis language,<ref name=ethno>"Matís." Ethnologue. Retrieved 6 Feb 2012.</ref> Portuguese
|related=
|native_name=|native_name_lang=}}

The Matis people (also called Matsë in their own native language) are an indigenous people of Brazil. The Matis are commonly named as the Jaguar people by tourists and filmmakers, but they do not like to be called like this. They live in three separate communities with total population of roughly 340. They live in the far west of Brazil, in the Vale do Javari Indigenous Territory, an area covering . They practice hunting, fishing, collecting (also called foraging) and agriculture. Now, they also receive money from their work as teacher, health assistance, surveillance of the territory when working for FUNAI, for example, and the elders receive pension from the government (inscribed as retired farmers, as other traditional communities also have the right for in Brazil).

Language
The Matis language belongs to the Panoan family from the Amazonian area of Brazil.

Recent history

Before what the government refers to as "contact", the Matis assumed passenger airplanes were xokeke, the spirits of their ancestors. They also assumed bush planes were binkeke'', a kind of strange demon-bird. This tribe saw the two kinds of airplanes as distinct phenomena, since passenger planes would appear to be smaller than the bush planes (which fly closer to the ground).

The Matis people were contacted by the Brazilian agency FUNAI during 1976-1978, although it was not until two years later in 1978 that FUNAI employees began visiting the then-five Matis villages, almost 2/3 of their population died from diseases and from the lack of care of Brazilian government that did not have even a backboard engine working to bring people to receive medical care (ARISI 2007).

The 1980s represented a moment where the Matis faced genocide (ethnical extermination), with the arrival of Western disease killing roughly a third of their population, devoid of natural immunity or any remedies for them. In 1981, over 50 Matis people died of disease, so the survivors moved to the Ituí River. By 1983, only 87 Matis people survived. The decade also saw the loss of three of their villages which now, completely abandoned, are occasionally visited by the Matis to harvest fruit trees.

Time has probably given the Matis a better understanding of events surrounding and following their first contact over 30 years ago. Whereas elder Matis traditionalists are keen to retain and in some cases readopt their old way of life, the younger Matis have been influenced by the modern outside world and want closer ties with modern Brazil, particularly for education.

On October 31, 2009, members of the Matis tribe located nine survivors of a plane crash near the Ituí River and then contacted the Brazilian Air Force.

References

External links
 Matis, BBC
 Matís quiver for blowgun darts, National Museum of the American Indian

Indigenous peoples in Brazil
Indigenous peoples of the Amazon